Rahim Nizar Jaffer (born December 15, 1971) is a former Canadian politician. He served in the House of Commons of Canada from 1997 to 2008, representing the Alberta riding of Edmonton—Strathcona as a member of the Conservative Party. He was the first Muslim elected to the Canadian Parliament. Jaffer became embroiled in a national controversy in 2010 after he appeared to receive "a break" from the justice system after being charged with drunk driving and possession of cocaine.

Early life
Jaffer is an Ismaili Muslim of Indian Gujarati descent. While young, Jaffer and his family emigrated to Canada to escape further persecution in Uganda after the government of Idi Amin confiscated their business and their home. They settled in Edmonton.

Jaffer completed a Bachelor of Arts degree at the University of Ottawa in political science and economics. He took his degree in the French language. He also served as a legislative assistant in the House of Commons. After completing his degree he returned to Edmonton, where he operated a successful coffee shop in the heart of the Old Strathcona district.

Political career
Jaffer was elected to the House of Commons as the Member of Parliament (MP) for Edmonton—Strathcona in the federal election on June 2, 1997, at the age of 25. He won the seat as a member of the Reform Party of Canada (later the Canadian Alliance, which later merged with the Progressive Conservatives to form the Conservative Party). Jaffer was re-elected in 2000.

In 2001, Matthew Johnston, an aide to Jaffer, impersonated him during a radio interview that Jaffer was himself unable to attend. Jaffer subsequently apologized for the stunt in the House of Commons and was suspended from his caucus position for several months. The incident was parodied by This Hour Has 22 Minutes, Rick Mercer performed a rap based on Eminem's "The Real Slim Shady", with the lyrics "Will the real Rahim Jaffer please stand up?

In the 2006 election, Jaffer was re-elected to serve a fourth term as the Member of Parliament for Edmonton—Strathcona. On February 8, 2006, Prime Minister Stephen Harper named him chair of the Conservative caucus.

Jaffer lost his seat in the 2008 election after he was defeated by New Democrat Linda Duncan. Jaffer was initially reluctant to concede defeat but finally did so on October 16 after the results were officially validated by the riding returning officer.

In 2009, Jaffer expressed interest in re-seeking the Conservative nomination for Edmonton—Strathcona at the next election. However, he declined to do so after it was claimed that he was shut out of nomination process.

Jaffer was once voted "laziest MP" in an annual survey by The Hill Times.

Personal life
On October 15, 2008, Jaffer married his former caucus colleague Helena Guergis, by then a Cabinet minister. This was her second marriage and his first.

Jaffer and Guergis became engaged in October 2007. Reportedly at the initiative of Guergis, the couple decided on the morning after the election to scrap their planned wedding date and to get married immediately. Their wedding was presided over by Ian McClelland, a former Member of Parliament and a licensed marriage commissioner, later that same day at McClelland's home. The marriage was witnessed by the couple's parliamentary colleague James Rajotte and by one of Jaffer's cousins.  In December 2010, the couple had a boy.

Arrest and conviction
On September 11, 2009, Jaffer was stopped late at night by the Ontario Provincial Police while he was traveling at a rate of 93 km/h in a 50 km/h zone in Palgrave, Ontario, located close to his wife's riding. The officer noticed a smell of alcohol on Jaffer's breath, and after administering a breathalyzer test, found him to be over the Ontario legal blood-alcohol limit of .08. Jaffer's driver's licence was suspended for 90 days, and he was charged with drunk driving and possession of an undisclosed quantity of cocaine. The location of the cocaine was a source of contention between police and Jaffer. The arresting officer stated that the drugs were found in Jaffer's pants pocket, whereas Jaffer's defense team claimed it was in his suit jacket. Earlier in the evening, he had met in Toronto with Nazim Gillani, a businessman. Gillani claimed he was a banker for the Hells Angels.

Jaffer was initially scheduled to appear in court in Orangeville, Ontario on October 19, 2009. During the 2008 election, Jaffer's campaign approved radio ads accusing NDP leader Jack Layton of being soft on marijuana use. On March 9, 2010, Jaffer pleaded guilty to one charge of careless driving and was sentenced to a fine of $500. The cocaine possession and drunk driving charges were withdrawn. Justice Doug Maund told Jaffer "I’m sure you can recognize a break when you see one." The sentence and the dropping of the more serious charges triggered outrage across Canada, as well as more extensive investigation of events leading up to the incident prompting the arrest, which led to allegations Jaffer met with several escorts.

Electoral record

References

External links
 Rahim Jaffer (archived version of http://www.rahimjaffer.com retrieved on Jun 12, 2008)

1971 births
Living people
Members of the House of Commons of Canada from Alberta
Reform Party of Canada MPs
Canadian Alliance MPs
Conservative Party of Canada MPs
People from Kampala
Ugandan emigrants to Canada
University of Ottawa alumni
21st-century Canadian politicians
Canadian politicians of Indian descent
Canadian Ismailis
Canadian people of Gujarati descent
Gujarati people